Bern is an unincorporated community in San Luis Obispo County, California, United States. The community had a post office from 1904 to 1932.

References

Unincorporated communities in San Luis Obispo County, California
Unincorporated communities in California